Indonesia competed at the 2000 Summer Olympics in Sydney, Australia.

Medalists

| width="78%" align="left" valign="top"|  

| width="22%" align="left" valign="top"|

| width="22%" align="left" valign="top"|

| width="22%" align="left" valign="top" |

Competitors 
The following is the list of number of competitors participating in the Games:

Archery 

Indonesia sent only one archer to Sydney.  She won her first match but was defeated in the second round.

Athletics 

 Key
 Note–Ranks given for track events are within the athlete's heat only
 Q = Qualified for the next round
 q = Qualified for the next round as a fastest loser or, in field events, by position without achieving the qualifying target
 NR = National record
 N/A = Round not applicable for the event
 Bye = Athlete not required to compete in round

Badminton 

Indonesia received one gold medal and two silver medals in badminton.
Men

Women

Mixed

Boxing

Diving 

Men's Competition

Women's Competition

Judo

Sailing 

Indonesia sent one man to compete in the Sailing venue at the 2000 Sydney Olympics.
Men

Swimming

Table tennis 

Men's singles
 Anton Suseno – 3 of 3, Group A
Men's doubles
 Anton Suseno and Ismu Harinto- Qualification Round Lost to Jorge Gambra and Augusto Morales (Chile)

Taekwondo 

Indonesia has qualified one taekwondo jin.

Tennis

Weightlifting 

Indonesia received their first ever medal in this competition, with one silver and two bronze medals in weightlifting.

See also
 2000 Olympic Games
 2000 Paralympic Games
 Indonesia at the Olympics
 Indonesia at the Paralympics
 Indonesia at the 2000 Summer Paralympics

References

Wallechinsky, David (2004). The Complete Book of the Summer Olympics (Athens 2004 Edition). Toronto, Canada. . 
International Olympic Committee (2001). The Results. Retrieved 12 November 2005.
Sydney Organising Committee for the Olympic Games (2001). Official Report of the XXVII Olympiad Volume 1: Preparing for the Games. Retrieved 20 November 2005.
Sydney Organising Committee for the Olympic Games (2001). Official Report of the XXVII Olympiad Volume 2: Celebrating the Games. Retrieved 20 November 2005.
Sydney Organising Committee for the Olympic Games (2001). The Results. Retrieved 20 November 2005.
International Olympic Committee Web Site

Nations at the 2000 Summer Olympics
2000
2000 in Indonesian sport